The Water of Ae is a tributary of the River Annan into which it flows west of Lockerbie in Dumfries and Galloway administrative county of South West Scotland in the United Kingdom. It rises on the eastern slopes of Queensberry.

References

External links
The Water of Ae at Bridge of Ae and the village

Ae